Chelakina is a genus of butterflies in the family Lycaenidae. In some systems it is a subgenus of Cebrella.

Lycaenidae
Lycaenidae genera